Formula Easter (or Forma Easter) was a single-seater, open wheel, open cockpit circuit car racing series during the 1970–1980s, specifically created for drivers from the communist bloc, driving cars created solely from parts manufactured by the COMECON industry or created from scratch as a citizens' initiative by Eastern Bloc residents. Nominally, the series belonged to FIA Formula Category 9 and Technical Group 8, although FIA only acknowledged but did not officially sanction its existence.

Technical specifics 

Engine displacement was maximized at 1300 cubic centimeters, which restriction lead to widespread adoption of the Lada (Zhiguli) 21011 car's engine bloc. These Soviet made inline-4 powerplants produced 70-75 hp off the assembly line, but could be tuned up to 90-110 hp with moderate effort.

The Formula Easter rulebook banned any modification of carburetors, pistons or the camshaft. Better financed and well-connected teams were able to source these parts from Lada cars specifically made for export markets outside the Eastern Bloc, as those batches exhibited better workmanship and more potential for tuning. Some teams opted for engines from the Dacia 1300, Polski Fiat 125p, Skoda 105 or Wartburg 353 cars, out of pride for national representation, but these equipment were less popular in the series.

Lada-sourced engines were sometimes connected to Soviet made, cast magnesium Zaporozhets ZAZ-968 car gearbox housings via custom-made, load-bearing interconnectors - which setup made it easier to access and swap out the ratio gears in the pit stop, thereby helping to alleviate the limits imposed by 4-speed push-wheel or stick shift transmissions.

Suspension was usually adapted from the East German Barkas minivans and teams filled the strut legs with in-house mixed oils to enhance their performance. Half-axles often came from the soviet-made UAZ all-terrain capable jeeps and minivans. Deceleration was provided by aftermarket-drilled soviet Lada brake discs, paired with East German, four-piston Wartburg calipers. The steering assembly was often adopted from East German Trabant mini-compact cars, but required extensive customization to fit available space.

Supporting industry and economic background 
Many teams decided to assemble their cars in their own garage or shed, the entire process sometimes taking as long as 4 years, when including the welding of a space frame tubular chassis and the ply-laying of fiberglass or synthetic resin bodywork, with the aerodynamics usually augmented by adding simple front and rear downforce wings.

Better financed teams could buy a ready-to-run Formula Easter racecar or just the bodied chassis from "Estonia" manufacture in the Baltic USSR or the "Metalex" garage in Czechoslovakia, but the controlling authority (technical committees) had a measure of success in enforcing the race series' declared and preferred low entry and low running costs nature.

Tires also had to be of "socialist origin" to be race legal, but minor teams had difficulty sourcing enough new racing tires, Czech-made Barum or Soviet Prostor wheel sets, thereby leading to a second-hand market of used, sometimes dangerously worn slicks. These were used during tests, so as not to degrade the precious few new racing tires before the race.

At the races
International Formula Easter events were often held at Schleiz (GDR), Autodrom Most (CZ), Minsk (Belorussian SSR) and Kyiv (Ukrainian SSR), as part of the Cup of Peace and Friendship series. Some countries also held national Formula Easter races, with up to two dozen participating cars.

The international series was consistently dominated by Soviet, East German and Czech-Slovakian teams, who could rely on a degree of support from their national car industries. Lesser teams, like the Hungarians (who had no domestic automobile manufacturing) had to resort to home-garage builds of racers, equipped with stock "non-export" Lada engines or rely on friendly donations of disused "Formula Junior" and "Formula V" cars from East Germany, which had to be extensively reworked to qualify for Formula Easter.

After the fall of communism, many Formula Easter teams and drivers converted to the Formula Ford series.

References

See also
 Keleti torpedok - Torpedoes of the East 
 Autoversenyzok (Race car drivers), a Hungarian docu-movie, 94 minutes, year 1979, scripted by Attila Foldi, directed by Peter Rona, photography by Sandor Dobai 
 Stiller, an amateur's struggle to race on the new Hungaroring'' (docu-drama aired by WDF, Westdeutscher Rundfunk Cologne television, 1986)

European auto racing series
Sports competitions in the Soviet Union
Motorsport in the Soviet Union